The Peterboro Basket Company is a basket manufacturer that has operated in Peterborough, New Hampshire for more than 160 years.

History
The company's history dates to 1841, when Amzi Childs came to Peterborough from Deerfield, Massachusetts to work on the manufacture of lead pipe. In 1854, he began weaving baskets in a building erected by Moses Chapman in 1830 as a wheelwright shop between Depot Street and the railroad tracks. Amzi Childs and Asa Henry made baskets for many years and had an excellent reputation. Their business burned in 1891. The business was sold to the McLane Basket Factory of Milford and moved there.

Henry B. Needham, "the dean of the basket manufacturing business in Peterborough," came to town in 1875 and for 15 years was foreman at the Childs' factory. After that factory burned in 1891, Needham established the Needham Basket Factory in a part of the White Machine Shop at Elm and Water streets. He constructed a new building in 1893. In 1916, the H. B. Needham Basket Company incorporated and purchased the shoe factory near the depot. In 1920, the Peterborough company was organized to build a new factory and combined with the Milford company. In 1926, the building was damaged by fire, and the present Peterboro Basket Company organized.

Long-time master craftsman Walter Hood began working at the Peterboro Basket Company in 1962 and ended his career with more than 50 years of basket making to his credit. "I like making baskets. They're one of the oldest creations of man," Hood said. "They date to before my time. I love my work."

External links
 The Peterboro Basket Company
 Town of Peterborough, New Hampshire
 Greater Peterborough Chamber of Commerce

Companies based in Hillsborough County, New Hampshire
Peterborough, New Hampshire